Qasem Khan castle is a historical castle located in Esfarayen County in North Khorasan Province, The longevity of this fortress dates back to the Middle Ages and Late Historical Periods of Islam.

References 

Castles in Iran